Urne is an unincorporated community located in the towns of Nelson and Modena, Buffalo County, Wisconsin, United States. The community was named after Ole J. Urne, a Norwegian immigrant who arrived in 1865. The post office was created in March 1873 as Urne's Corners.

References

Unincorporated communities in Buffalo County, Wisconsin
Unincorporated communities in Wisconsin